Ramu is an upazila of Cox's Bazar District in the Division of Chittagong, Bangladesh.

Geography
It has 26964 households and the area of the town is 22.03 km2.

Demographics
As of the 1991 Bangladesh census, Ramu has a population of 167480. Males constitute 51.41% of the population, and females 48.59%. This Upazila's eighteen up population is 74742. Ramu has an average literacy rate among town people is 34%., and the national average of 32.4% literate. Ramu thana was transformed into an upazila in 1983. It consists of 9 union parishads, 39 mouzas and 102 villages.

Administration
Ramu Upazila is divided into 11 union parishads: Chakmarkul, Dakshin Mithachhari, Eidghar, Fotekharkul, Garjoniya, Jouarianala, Kacchapia, Kauwarkhop, Khuniapalong, Rajarkul, and Rashidnagar. The union parishads are subdivided into 39 mauzas and 102 villages. the union parishad

References

Upazilas of Cox's Bazar District